CK Swiss Valley Association Football Club  is a Welsh football team based near Llanelli, Wales. They play in the West Wales Premier League which is in the fourth tier of the Welsh football league system.

History

For the 2020–21 season the club joined the newly formed tier 4 West Wales Premier League having previously played in the Carmarthenshire League Premier Division.

Honours
Carmarthenshire League Division Three – Champions: 2016–17
Carmarthenshire League Division Four – Champions: 2011–12

Youth system

The team has a wide range of youth teams including Under 12s, and lots more.
The Under 12s team feature lots of young talents and great players.
They have been successful in the league so far (as of 15th November), and have beaten Llandovery U12s and Llangenech U12s. They beat Llangenech with a last minute free kick winner, and won 3-2 with the help of Cody Hughes, and another child, who scored a brace.

References

External links
Official club twitter
Official club Facebook

Football clubs in Wales
West Wales Premier League clubs
Carmarthenshire League clubs